On 29 January 2023, a bus carrying at least 43 people plunged into a ravine and caught fire in Bela Tehsil, Lasbela District, Balochistan, Pakistan. The crash initially killed 40 people and injured three, one of whom died shortly after. The two remaining survivors were in a "serious" condition.

Crash 
The bus was en route to Karachi from Quetta when it crashed into a pillar of a bridge which led to its fall, according to Lasbela's assistant commissioner Hamza Anjum. Head of the local rescue service Asghar Ramazan told Agence France-Presse that the bus was "loaded with containers of oil." 

Most of the bodies of the dead were burned beyond recognition, and were taken to Karachi where DNA testing would be used to establish their identities.

Aftermath
The chairman of the Pakistan People's Party and foreign minister Bilawal Bhutto Zardari said the entire country was saddened and that he sends his condolences. He said an investigation into the crash will be carried out.

Investigation 
Lasbela Deputy Commissioner Murad Kasi said the cause of the accident was speeding, with the driver losing control of the vehicle while making a U-turn. There were unconfirmed reports that the bus was transporting smuggled Iranian oil. The All Quetta-Karachi Coaches Union blamed the crash on slippery roads and a short circuit in the bus' wiring.

See also

Kallar Kahar school bus accident (2011)
2013 Pakistan gas bus explosion
2014 Khairpur bus crash
2015 Karachi traffic accident
2023 Kallar Kahar bus accident

References

2023 fires in Asia
2023 in Balochistan, Pakistan
2023 road incidents
2020s road incidents in Asia
Bus incidents in Pakistan
Disasters in Balochistan, Pakistan
Fires in Pakistan
January 2023 events in Pakistan
2023 bus crash
Vehicle fires in Asia